The Kansk-Achinsk coal basin (Канско-Ачинский угольный бассейн) is a lignite coal basin located in the Krasnoyarsk territory and partly in the Kemerovo and Irkutsk regions.

The Central-Siberian basin has the most significant reserves of open-pit mined brown-coal. Its share in national coal production was 12%, second only to the Kuznetsk basin with 52%.

External links
 

Coal mining regions in Russia